North East Zone Culture Centre  in Chümoukedima in Nagaland state is one of many regional cultural centres established by the Indian Government to preserve and promote traditional cultural heritage of India. The North East Cultural Zone is one of seven Cultural Zones of India defined and provided with administrative infrastructure by the Government of India.

Other Regional Cultural Centres of India
 East Zone Cultural Centre, Kolkata
 North Zone Cultural Centre, Patiala
 West Zone Cultural Centre, Udaipur
 South Zone Cultural Centre, Tanjavur

References

External links
Official website

Culture of Nagaland
 Chümoukedima
Cultural organisations based in India
Cultural centres in India